was a Japanese all-female rock band from Kawasaki, Kanagawa. Formed in 2011, the band is signed with Poppo Express and is currently affiliated with Epic Records Japan. Their name originates from the female name “Peggy”.

On July 8, 2022, the band announced that they would be going on indefinite hiatus in September the same year, following the release of a best of compilation album MMY and final tour "the peggies tour 2022 My White".

Members
Yuuho Kitazawa（北澤ゆうほ）(born December 2, 1995; Tokyo, Japan) is the vocalist and the guitarist of the band, and is in charge of songwriting, composition, and arrangement of songs. Her band nickname is "Yuyūho".
Makiko Ishiwata（石渡マキコ）(born August 27, 1995; Tokyo, Japan) is the bassist of the band. Her band nickname is "Megamakiko".
Miku Onuki（大貫みく） (born April 23, 1995; Kanagawa Prefecture, Japan) is the drummer of the band. Her band nickname is "Minimiku".

Discography

Singles

Extended plays

Albums

Tours

Solo live

Live Tour

References

External links
  
 

All-female bands
Japanese alternative rock groups
Japanese pop rock music groups
Japanese musical trios
Musical groups established in 2011
Musical groups from Kanagawa Prefecture
People from Kawasaki, Kanagawa
2011 establishments in Japan